Kevin D. Admiral is a United States Army major general serving as director of force management of the United States Army. Before that, he served as commandant of the United States Army Armor School at Fort Benning from September 2019 to May 2021, and prior to that, as deputy commanding general for maneuver of the 4th Infantry Division from 2018 to 2019.

References

Living people
Date of birth missing (living people)
Year of birth missing (living people)
University of Kansas alumni
Recipients of the Defense Superior Service Medal
Recipients of the Legion of Merit
United States Army generals